The Netherlands Antilles participated at the Olympic Games from 1952 until 2008. As a constituent country of the Kingdom of the Netherlands, it supported the Netherlands' boycott of the 1956 Games and also joined the American-led boycott of the 1980 Summer Olympics. The Netherlands Antilles participated in the Winter Olympic Games twice.

The National Olympic Committee for the Netherlands Antilles was created in 1931 and recognized by the International Olympic Committee from 1950 until 2011 upon the dissolution of the Netherlands Antilles. At the 2012 Olympics, participants from the five islands competed as independent athletes under the Olympic flag.

History

Consisting entities 

  (until 1986)
 
 
 
 
 

Aruba left the Netherlands Antilles in 1986 to become a constituent country within the Kingdom of the Netherlands. Since then, their athletes have competed separately under their own Olympic banner. After the dissolution of the Netherlands Antilles in 2010, Bonaire, Sint Eustatius and Saba became part of the Netherlands as special municipalities of the Netherlands. Curaçao and Sint Maarten became separate constituent countries of the Kingdom of the Netherlands. In 2016, athletes from these five islands will have the choice to compete either with the Netherlands Olympic team or Aruba's.

All the above are collectively called "Dutch Caribbean".

Flags 

Three participants from the five islands of the former Netherlands Antilles can compete as independent athletes at the 2012 Summer Olympics. They used the Olympic Flag.

Dissolution of the Netherlands Antilles 

Following the dissolution of the Netherlands Antilles, the Netherlands Antilles Olympic Committee was no longer recognised as a National Olympic Committee.
At the 2012 Olympics, participants from the five islands competed as independent athletes under the Olympic flag. Three athletes from the former Netherlands Antilles participated as part of the team of Independent Athletes: Liemarvin Bonevacia in the men's athletics (400m), Philipine Van Aanholt in the women's sailing (laser radial class) and Reginald de Windt in the men's judo (81kg). All three are from Curaçao. Churandy Martina competed for the Netherlands. At the 2016 Olympics, Martina, Bonevacia, Hensley Paulina and Jean-Julien Rojer competed for the Netherlands while Van Aanholt competed for Aruba.

Participation

Timeline of participation

Overview of Olympic participation

Netherlands Antilles at the Summer Olympics

Netherlands Antilles at the Winter Olympics

Medals by sport

List of medalists 

Jan Boersma was the only Netherlands Antillean athlete to win an Olympic medal, a silver medal in sailing in 1988. They nearly earned another silver in men's 200m in Beijing 2008. Churandy Martina finished second, behind Usain Bolt but was disqualified after an American protest due to his running outside of his lane during the race. Martina's disqualification was appealed but was rejected by the Court of Arbitration for Sport on March 6, 2009.

See also
 Aruba at the Olympics
 :Category:Olympic competitors for the Netherlands Antilles
 Tropical nations at the Winter Olympics

References

External links